Caloplaca digitaurea is a species of lichen in the family Teloschistaceae. Found in Chile, it was described as new to science in 2011.

See also
List of Caloplaca species

References

Teloschistales
Lichen species
Lichens described in 2011
Lichens of Chile